You're All I Need is a 1968 album by Marvin Gaye and Tammi Terrell.

"You're All I Need" may also refer to:

Songs
"You're All I Need" (song) by Mötley Crüe
"You're All I Need", a song by Billy Eckstine from the 1994 album Everything I Have Is Yours
"You're All I Need", a song by Bobby Bland, 1967
"You're All I Need", a song by Carmel, 1992
"You're All I Need", a song by En Vogue from the 1997 album EV3
"You're All I Need", a song by White Lion from Mane Attraction, 1991

See also
"You're All I Need to Get By" by Marvin Gaye and Tammi Terrell
All I Need  (disambiguation)